Sanjeev Kumar (born Harihar Jethalal Jariwala; 9 July 1938 – 6 November 1985) was an Indian actor. He is well remembered for his versatility and genuine portrayal of his characters. He acted in genres ranging from romantic dramas to thrillers, and was voted the seventh greatest actor of Indian cinema of all time in a poll conducted by Rediff.com. His double role in the film Angoor was listed among the 25 best acting performances of Indian cinema by Forbes India on the occasion of celebrating 100 years of Indian Cinema. 

He won several major awards, including two National Film Awards for Best Actor for his performances in the movies Dastak (1970) and Koshish (1972). Kumar did not mind playing roles that were non-glamorous, such as characters well beyond his age. Movies such as iconic character Thakur in Sholay (1975) Arjun Pandit (1976) and Trishul (1978), along with the remakes of Tamil films into Hindi such as Khilona (1970), Naya Din Nai Raat (1974), Yehi Hai Zindagi (1977),  Devata (1978) and Ram Tere Kitne Naam (1985) exemplify his versatility. He also did suspense-thriller films such as Shikar (1968), Uljhan (1975) and Trishna (1978) and Qatl (1986), Kumar also proved himself to do comedy in films such as Manchali (1973), Pati Patni Aur Woh (1978), Biwi-O-Biwi (1981) Angoor (1982) and Hero (1983).

Early Life and Background 
Sanjeev Kumar was born as Harihar Jethalal Jariwala (also referred to as Haribhai) on 9 July 1938 in Surat to a Gujarati family, he came to Mumbai when he was very young. A stunt in a film school led him to Bollywood, where he eventually became an accomplished actor. He is widely acclaimed by the critics and general public alike to be one of the all-time greatest actors that Indian Cinema has ever produced.
Kumar had two younger brothers and one sister.
He spoke Gujarati, Hindi and English fluently.

Career 

Kumar started his acting career as a stage actor, starting with IPTA in Bombay and later joining the Indian National Theatre. Even as a stage actor, he had a penchant for playing older roles; at age 22, he played an old man in an adaptation of Arthur Miller's All My Sons. In the following year, in the play Damru directed by AK Hangal, he again played the role of a 60-year-old with six children.

He made his film debut with a small role in Hum Hindustani in 1960. His first film as a protagonist was in Nishan (1965). In 1968, he acted alongside the famous actor of that time, Dilip Kumar, in Sangharsh. He also starred opposite Shammi Kapoor and Sadhana in the superhit film Sachaai (1969).

He starred in the 1966 Gujarati film Kalapi, which was based on the poet Kalapi's life, with him playing the titular role, Padmarani playing the role of his wife, Rama, and Aruna Irani as the love interest. The film was directed by Manhar Raskapur. Later Aruna Irani was paired opposite Sanjeev in another Gujarati film, Mare Javun Pele Par (1968).

In 1970, the movie Khilona, which was the remake of Gujarati film mare javu pele paar 1968, brought Kumar national recognition. In 1972, he played in an Indo-Iranian film, Subah aur Shaam. This was when the director Gulzar first spotted him. Later he cast Kumar in the roles of older men in 4 films Parichay (1972), Koshish (1973), Aandhi (1975) and Mausam (1975). Gulzar cast Kumar in role of young man in the films Angoor (1981) and Namkeen (1982). Kumar won the BFJA Awards for Best Actor (Hindi) for his exemplary portrayal of a deaf and mute person in Koshish, in which the female lead was played by Jaya Bhaduri, who acted as his deaf and mute wife and was herself nominated for Best Actor award by Filmfare for the same role. He went on to star in the box office hits Seeta Aur Geeta (1972), Manchali (1973) and Aap Ki Kasam (1974). In 1973, he made a guest appearance during a song in a Tamil movie, Bharatha Vilas (1973). He performed in nine movies directed by Gulzar. Hrishikesh Mukherjee directed him in Arjun Pandit, for which he won the Filmfare Best Actor Award.

He did three films opposite famous Tamil actress L. Vijayalakshmi, including Husn Aur Ishq and Badal which became hits. Their first film was Alibaba Aur 40 Chor which was unsuccessful. His Raja Aur Runk, released in 1968, was a great success. He did Kangan, Rivaaz, Zindagi, Beraham, Archana and Do Ladkiyan opposite Mala Sinha. He did Priya, Anubhav, Gustaaki Maaf, Bachpan and Khud-Daar with Tanuja. He was paired with Rakhee in Angaare, Paras, Trishna, Shriman Shrimati and Hamare Tumhare. His hits with Leena Chandavarkar included Apne Rang Hazar, Manchali and Anhonee. He was paired regularly with Sulakshana Pandit in films such as Uljhan and Waqt Ki Deewar and with Moushmi Chatterjee in Itni Si Baat and Daasi.

The producers and directors of the South wanted to remake their Tamil and Telugu films in Hindi with either Kumar or Rajesh Khanna in lead. It was these Hindi film remakes which elevated him to a great actor. The film Khilona and its Tamil version Engirundho Vandhaal were made simultaneously. Navarathri was remade as Naya Din Nai Raat. Kumar reprised the role played by Thengai Srinivasan in Yehi Hai Zindagi which was a remake of Kaliyuga Kannan. He starred as the lead in the film Shaandaar in 1974 which was a remake of Kasturi Nivasa which had Kannada actor Dr. Rajkumar in the lead. He enacted the role played by AVM Rajan in Anadhai Aanandhan, in its Hindi version Chanda Aur Bijli in 1970. Gnana Oli was remade as Devata in 1976 with he reprising the role originally paid by Sivaji Ganesan. He also acted in the Telugu remake of Swargam Narakam, as Swarg Narak (1978). Though the film Suraag was a hit, during the mid-1980s, Northern Indian producers and directors cast Sanjeev Kumar primarily in supporting roles in films like Khudaar, Sawaal, Zabardast, Hero, and Silsila. However southern Indian directors cast him in lead roles even in the period 1980 to 1985. He played the role which N.T. Rama Rao did originally in Devina Chesina Manushulu, in its Hindi version Takkar in 1980. Tayaramma Bangarayya was remade as Shriman Shrimati in 1982, Raman Ethanai Ramanadi was remade as Raam Kitne Tere Naam in 1985. Kumar reprised the role played by R.Muthuraman in Alukuoru Aasai in its Hindi remake Itni Si Baat in 1981.  Sivaji Ganesan gave Kumar a role in his own home production Gauri (1968), which was a remake of Shanti (1965). The role played by S.S. Rajendran in Shanti was re-enacted by Kumar in Gauri.

Sanjeev Kumar's excellent comic timing entertained audiences in films such as Seeta Aur Geeta, Biwi O Biwi (1981), Pati, Patni Aur Woh, Angoor (1982) and Hero (1983).

His performances in films such as Charitraheen, Angaare, Grihapravesh, Chehre Pe Chehra, Sawaal and Yaadgaar, though they became-box office flops, were appreciated by critics and during their subsequent screening on television. Kumar always demonstrated a willingness to take on unconventional roles that challenged him as an actor. His role as Mirza Sajjad Ali, a chess-obsessed Lucknowi (citizen of Lucknow), in Satyajit Ray's classic Shatranj Ke Khilari (1977) exemplified that aspect. Perhaps his best-remembered roles were in the blockbuster films Sholay (1975) and Trishul (1978). His portrayal of the character Thakur, from Sholay, released in August 1975, was one of his stellar performances. In Naya Din Nayi Raat (1974), Sanjeev Kumar reprised the nine-role epic performance by Sivaji Ganesan in Navarathri (Tamil; 1964), which was also previously reprised by Akkineni Nageswara Rao in Navarathri (Telugu; 1966). This film enhanced his status and reputation as a serious player in Bollywood. He stood his ground against leading superstars such as Rajesh Khanna in Bandhan and Aap Ki Kasam; Amitabh Bachchan and Shashi Kapoor in the Yash Chopra multi-star cast film Trishul (1978) and Dilip kumar in the  film 'Sangharsh' and Vidhaata (1982).

He has done many regional films in different languages including Marathi, Punjabi, Tamil, Telugu, Sindhi and his mother tongue Gujarati. In 1980, he starred in the Punjabi movie Fauji Chacha.He made guest appearances in two Tamil films, Bharata Vilas and Uyarndhavargal (a remake of Koshish).

Personal life 
Kumar remained single all his life. He had proposed to Hema Malini in 1973 and they remained in touch even after he suffered his first heart attack in 1976. Sulakshana Pandit later recounted having been in love with him and having had proposed marriage to him which he politely declined. It is speculated as a result of this rejection, Sulakshana Pandit chose to remain unmarried.

Health Problems and Death 
After his first heart attack, he underwent a bypass in the US. However, on 6 November 1985, at the age of 47, he suffered a massive heart attack, which resulted in his death. His younger brother Nikul died before him, while his other brother Kishore died six months later. Although he was an actor who had played many elderly roles, he died before he reached 50 years of age.

More than ten movies starring Sanjeev Kumar were released after his death, with the last one, Professor Ki Padosan, released in 1993. At the time of his death, only about three-fourths of this movie was complete, and it was eventually decided to alter the story line in the second half to explain the absence of Kumar's character.

Awards

Film Awards

Other Awards 
 1969 – Naval Stars Awards, Shanoo Varun Trophy by S.M. Nanda
 1971 – Surat Jilla Leuva Patidar Gnyati.
 1975 – Cinegoers Council (Delhi) Film Awards
 1976 – Lion Club of North Calcutta Actor of the year for Mausam
 1984 – Maratha Seva Sangh Dist Khed
 Best Actor (Stage) for the Gujarati play Koi no Ladakh Vayo
 Kalashri Art & Network "Lifetime Achievement Millenium 2000 Award" at Surat
 18th National Award "Bharat Puraskar" by Information & Broadcast State Minister Mrs. Nandini Satapthi at Shanmukhanand Hall (Mumbai)
 Army Officers Voice Association Trophy
 Andhra Pradesh Film Journalist Award
 Chitralok Cine Serjak Award (Ahmedabad)

Government Recognition 

A road has been named after him in Surat, Gujarat as Sanjeev Kumar Marg, which was inaugurated by Sunil Dutt.

A school has been named after him in his home town Surat, Gujarat, and was inaugurated by the then Mayor Kadir K. Pirzada.

A postage stamp was released by India Post to honour him on 3 May 2013.

An auditorium, named Sanjeev Kumar Auditorium built by the Surat Municipal Corporation at the cost of 108cr, was opened in his home town Surat. It was inaugurated on 14 February 2014 by Shri Narendra Modiji. https://www.narendramodi.in/sanjeev-kumar-auditorium-in-surat

Philanthropy 
The Sanjeev Kumar Foundation is a national level development organisation (NGO) directly benefiting children and their families every year, mainly focusing on education, healthcare, environment, culture and nutrition. From 2015 onwards the foundation has also been the sponsor of the annual Sanjeev Kumar Drama Competition held by the Surat Municipal Corporation. The awards and cash prizes are given in memory of Sanjeev Kumar to the best actor, actress, director and backstage technician every year.

References

External links 
 
 http://www.forbesindia.com/article/100-years-of-indian-cinema/25-greatest-acting-performances-of-indian-cinema/35125/1

1938 births
1985 deaths
Indian male film actors
Male actors in Hindi cinema
People from Surat
Gujarati people
20th-century Indian male actors
Indian male stage actors
Best Actor National Film Award winners
Male actors from Gujarat
Filmfare Awards winners